Veniamin Iosifovich Fleishman, (July 20, 1913 in Bezhetsk, Tver Governorate – September 14, 1941 in Krasnoye Selo, Leningrad Oblast) was a Soviet composer.

Rothschild's Violin
While studying under Dmitri Shostakovich at the Leningrad Conservatory (1939–1941), he began a one-act opera Rothschild's Violin based on Anton Chekhov's short story of the same name about Bronza, a Russian country coffin-maker and violinist, and his combative relationship with the Jewish musicians in his village.

At the outbreak of World War II, Fleishman volunteered for the front and was killed before he could complete the work. In memory of his talented student, Shostakovich rescued the manuscript from besieged Leningrad, finished it and orchestrated it in 1943–1944. Shostakovich dated his completion of the score February 5, 1944. Later, he exerted influence so that the opera should be published and performed.

The opera's world premiere concert performance took place on June 20, 1960, at the USSR Union of Soviet Composers, Moscow, with the soloists and members of the Moscow Philharmonic Society. The opera was first staged in April 1968, Leningrad, at the Experimental Studio of Chamber Opera. The artistic director was Solomon Volkov, and the conductor Yuri Kochnev.

Quotations
"...my student Veniamin Fleishman wrote an opera based on Chekhov's Rothschild's Violin. I suggested that he do an opera on the subject. Fleishman was a sensitive spirit and he had a fine rapport with Chekhov. But he had a hard life. Fleishman had a tendency to write sad music rather than happy music, and naturally, he was abused for it. Fleishman sketched out the opera but then he volunteered for the army. He was killed. He went into the People's Volunteer Guard. They were all candidates for corpsehood..." (Dmitri Shostakovich, Testimony, p. 225)
"I'm happy that I managed to complete Rothschild's Violin and orchestrate it. It's a marvellous opera – sensitive and sad. There are no cheap effects in it; it is wise and very Chekhovian. I'm sorry that theatres pass over Fleishman's opera. It's certainly not the fault of the music, as far as I can see." (Dmitri Shostakovich, Testimony, p. 225)

Recordings
Veniamin Fleishman: Rothschild's Violin with Sergei Leiferkus, Konstantin Pluzhnikov, Ilya Levinsky, Marina Shaguch, Rotterdam Philharmonic Orchestra, Gennadi Rozhdestvensky, RCA Red Seal 09026 68434-2

References

External links
Rothschild's Violin, Boosey & Hawkes]
"My Shostakovich" by Dmitri N. Smirnov

1913 births
1941 deaths
People from Bezhetsk
People from Bezhetsky Uyezd
Russian Jews
Jewish classical composers
Male opera composers
Jewish opera composers
Soviet opera composers
Soviet Jews in the military
Soviet military personnel killed in World War II